Lester "Buster" Sheary was a college men's basketball coach. He was the head coach of Holy Cross from 1948 to 1955. He coached Holy Cross to a 155-36 record, winning the 1954 National Invitation Tournament and made two NCAA tournament appearances.  He coached three All-American players: Bob Cousy, Tom Heinsohn, and Togo Palazzi.

Head coaching record

References

Date of birth unknown
2001 deaths
American men's basketball coaches
Holy Cross Crusaders men's basketball coaches
Catholic University of America alumni
1908 births